The Raiders (reissued as Riders of Vengeance) is a 1952 American Western film directed by Lesley Selander and starring Richard Conte and Viveca Lindfors.

Plot

Going west where gold is being found, Jan Morell and wife Mary meet in the Napa, California, valley with his prospector brother Frank, but soon hired gunmen Jack Welch and Hank Purvis steal the gold they have panned and kill Mary.

In town, Frank is killed, as well, and Jan seriously wounded. He is cared for by Felipe de Ortega and sister Elena, who explain that Welch and Purvis work for dishonest Mayor Thomas Ainsworth, who also stole the Ortega family's land and property. An approval of statehood for California could restore law and order, as well as citizens' rights.

Elena fears for their safety, but Jan joins forces with Felipe's men to create havoc in Ainsworth's life, rustling horses and stealing money. A new U.S. marshal, Henderson, places a $5,000 reward on him, but Jan nevertheless captures Purvis and threatens to lynch him if he does not confess to Ainsworth's misdeeds. Elizabeth Ainsworth now begins to understand her father's corrupt ways.

As the gunfighting intensifies, both Welch and Felipe are killed. Jan is arrested and faces the hangman, but Henderson believes in his innocence and is able to release him when statehood wins approval and a general amnesty is granted. Jan and Elena plan a new life together.

Cast
 Richard Conte as Jan Morrell
 Viveca Lindfors as Elena de Ortega
 Barbara Britton as Elizabeth Ainsworth
 William Bishop as Marshal Bill Henderson
 Hugh O'Brian as Hank Purvis
 Morris Ankrum as Thomas Ainsworth
 Margaret Field as Mary Morrell
 Richard Martin as Felipe de Ortega
 William Reynolds as Frank Morrell
 Gregg Palmer as Marty Smith (as Palmer Lee)
 John Kellogg as Jack Welch
 Frank Wilcox as Sam Sterling
 Carlos Rivero as Ramon 
 I. Stanford Jolley as Mountain Jim Ferris
 Neyle Morrow as Juan
 Francis McDonald as Mr. John Cummings
 George J. Lewis as Vicente (as George Lewis)

References

External links
 
 
 

1952 films
1950s English-language films
American Western (genre) films
1952 Western (genre) films
Films directed by Lesley Selander
Universal Pictures films
1950s American films